Qiu Yike (born 18 January 1985), is a male Chinese international table tennis player.

He won the bronze medal at the 2005 World Table Tennis Championships Mixed Doubles and 2007 World Table Tennis Championships – Mixed Doubles with Cao Zhen.

See also
 List of table tennis players

References

Living people
Sportspeople from Chengdu
Table tennis players from Sichuan
1985 births
Chinese male table tennis players
World Table Tennis Championships medalists